Marcus Björk (born 24 November 1997) is a Swedish professional ice hockey defenseman currently playing for the  Columbus Blue Jackets of the National Hockey League (NHL).

Playing career
Undrafted into the NHL, Björk played professionally in Sweden in the Swedish Hockey League from 2018 to 2022 with Örebro HK, the Malmö Redhawks and Brynäs IF. 

He signed as a free agent to a one-year, entry-level contract with the Columbus Blue Jackets on 24 May 2022 After attending his first NHL training camp, Björk was assigned to begin the  season with AHL affiliate, the Cleveland Monsters. 

Following 11 games with the Monsters, with the Blue Jackets suffering a glut of injuries, Björk was recalled and made his NHL debut on 12 November 2022, and scored in a 4-3 overtime defeat to the New York Islanders, becoming just the seventh player in franchise history to do so.

Career statistics

Awards and honors

References

External links

1997 births
Living people
Asplöven HC players
Brynäs IF players
Cleveland Monsters players
Columbus Blue Jackets players
Malmö Redhawks players
Omaha Lancers players
Örebro HK players
IK Oskarshamn players
Sportspeople from Umeå
Undrafted National Hockey League players